Richard H. Brown was chairman and chief executive officer of Electronic Data Systems Corporation from 1999 to 2003; chief executive officer of Cable & Wireless plc from 1996 to 1998; a director of E.I. du Pont de Nemours and Company from 2001 to 2015 and a director of Home Depot. 

President and chief executive officer of H&R Block, Inc. and vice chairman of Ameritech Corporation. He is a member of The Business Council, and a former member of the U.S.-Japan Business Council; the French-American Business Council and the President's National Security Telecommunications Advisory Committee.

In 2003, BusinessWeek included Brown in its list of worst managers for 2002.

References

Year of birth missing (living people)
Living people
American technology chief executives
H&R Block
The Home Depot people
DuPont people
Directors of Chemours